Chahar Mast (also Romanized as Chahār Mast; also known as Chahār Faṣel) is a village in Bam Rural District, Bam and Safiabad District, Esfarayen County, North Khorasan Province, Iran. At the 2006 census, its population was 82, in 21 families.

References 

Populated places in Esfarayen County